Travis Perkins plc is a British builders' merchant and home improvement retailer with head offices based in Northampton. It is listed on the London Stock Exchange, and is a constituent of the FTSE 250 Index.

History
The company began in 1797, when the Benjamin Ingram company of joiners and carpenters was founded at Beech Street in London. Benjamin Ingram subsequently merged with Perkins to become Ingram Perkins in 1850. Ingram Perkins then merged with Sandell Smythe & Drayson in 1970 to form Sandell Perkins.

Sandell Perkins was first listed on the London Stock Exchange in 1986, shortly before it merged with Travis & Arnold in 1988, to form Travis Perkins.

Subsequent acquisitions have included AAH (46 branches) in March 1994, BMSS (26 branches) in December 1995, Keyline Builders Merchants (101 branches) in May 1999, and Sharpe & Fisher (38 branches) in 1998, Broombys Limited (nine branches) in January 2000, City Plumbing Supplies Limited (48 branches) in July 2002, and Commercial Ceiling Factors (twenty distribution centres) in October 2002, Jayhard (53 branches) in August 2003, and B&G (twelve branches) in October 2003, Wickes (171 stores) in December 2004, and Tile Giant in November 2007.

The company had a particularly challenging time following the financial crisis of 2007–2008; it stopped its dividend and indicated it was open to declaring a rights issue.

In May 2010, Travis Perkins made a successful offer to acquire BSS Group for £553m, and then acquired the remaining 70% stake in Toolstation in January 2012, and the whole of Solfex in January 2013.

In November 2017, Travis Perkins sought support from the local community in Pimlico, when the oldest timber yard in the United Kingdom, owned by Travis Perkins, was threatened by closure to allow a housing development to proceed.

In December 2018, Travis Perkins announced plans to sell City Plumbing Supplies and its other plumbing and heating businesses. In October 2019, Travis Perkins announced this decision had been paused.

In June 2020, Travis Perkins sought to cut 2,500 jobs under plans to close 165 branches during the COVID-19 pandemic in the United Kingdom.

In October 2020, it was announced that Travis Perkins had sold Tile Giant to Coverings Ltd.

In April 2021 the demerger of Wickes Group plc was completed.

In May 2021 the company announced that it had agreed to sell its plumbing and heating businesses to H.I.G. Capital.

Operations
The company's product lines include general building materials, timber, plumbing & heating, kitchens, bathrooms, landscaping materials and tool hire.

See also 
Constance Travis

References

External links

Yahoo profile

Building materials companies of the United Kingdom
Companies based in Northampton
Retail companies established in 1988
Companies listed on the London Stock Exchange
Wholesalers of the United Kingdom